À l'envers is the debut studio album by French singer Steeve Estatof. It was released on 23 August 2004 via BMG France. The album received commercial success with 62,000 sales.

Background 
Estatof spoke of the album, he said "After the first bounty at Baltard, everyone loved me... Insults and criticism followed, and my parents even received threats... The problem is not celebrity, but badly educated people, who come to ask you when you go on TV. And who treat you right after 'sold'."

Track listing 
 "Garde Moi"
 "Je m'en foutre"
 "Un peu de nous deux"
 "Ma vie devant toi"
 "Le succès rend con"
 "Stella"
 "Enfin"
 "Le temps, Le héros"
 "Je n'entends rien"
 "Si je reviens"
 "1977"

Charts

References 

Sony BMG albums
French-language albums
Steeve Estatof albums
2004 albums